Cantus Buranus II is a studio album by Neo-Medieval band Corvus Corax.

Track listing

 "Veritas Simplex" - 8:30
 "Miser" - 5:20
 "Custodes Sunt Raptores" - 6:09
 "De Mundi Statu" - 4:58
 "Ordu Languet" - 5:55
 "Vitium In Opere" - 6:18
 "Quid Agam" - 5:50
 "Causa Ludi" - 4:16
 "Ingordin Et Ingordan" - 6:16
 "Magnum Detrimentum" - 4:52
 "In Orbem Universum" - 5:32
 "O Varium Fortune" - 5:51
 "Chou Chou Sheng - Preces Ad Imperatorem (bonus track)" - 7:05

Notes 
All lyrics by Cantus Buranus.
Recorded at Pica Music Studios and studio of Deutsches Filmorchester Babelsberg.

References

External links 
 
 Corvus Corax at Reverbnation
 Cantus Buranus II at Discogs
 Cantus Buranus II at Rateyourmusic

2008 albums
Corvus Corax (band) albums
Medieval music albums